"Sweetie Pie" is a song written by Eddie Cochran, Jerry Capehart, and Johnny Russell and recorded by Eddie Cochran. It was recorded in 1957 and released posthumously as a single on Liberty F-55278 in August 1960. In the UK the single rose to number 38 on the charts. The U.S. release did not chart. The flip side, "Lonely", reached number 41 on the UK singles chart. Keld Heich has recorded the song in 2010.

Album Appearances
The song appeared on the 1962 Never To Be Forgotten album, the 1979 Eddie Cochran Singles Album compilation, the 1999 Eddie Cochran: Legends Of The 20th Century collection on EMI, the 2005 The Best of Eddie Cochran album on EMI, and the 2009 Bear Family Records box set Somethin' Else: The Ultimate Collection.

Personnel
 Eddie Cochran: vocal, guitar
 Conrad 'Guybo' Smith: electric bass
 Perry Botkin: rhythm guitar
 Unidentified: drums

Chart performance

Notes

External links
 Eddie Cochran US discography

Eddie Cochran songs
Songs written by Eddie Cochran
Liberty Records singles
1960 singles
1960 songs
Songs written by Jerry Capehart
Songs written by Johnny Russell (singer)